Sir Algernon Edward West  (4 April 1832 – 21 March 1921) was an English civil servant. He acted as Principal Private Secretary to Prime Minister William Gladstone.

Biography
He was the third son of Martin John West and Lady Maria Walpole, third daughter of Horatio Walpole, 2nd Earl of Orford; Edward West was his uncle. He was educated at Eton College and Christ Church, Oxford, where he matriculated in 1850. He left after two terms, becoming a clerk in the Inland Revenue, and then transferring to the Admiralty.

West was Private Secretary to Gladstone between 1861 and 1894. He was a Progressive Party Alderman of London County Council from 1898 to 1907. He held the office of Justice of the Peace (JP) for Middlesex. He held the office of Chairman of the Board of the Inland Revenue. He was invested as a Knight Commander of the Order of the Bath (KCB) on 30 July 1886. He was promoted to a Knight Grand Cross of the order (GCB) in the 1902 Coronation Honours list published on 26 June 1902, and was invested by King Edward VII at Buckingham Palace on 8 August 1902. He was later invested as a Privy Counsellor (PC).

From 1880, West lived at the manor at Wanborough, Surrey.  West entertained many political figures at the manor including Gladstone, Queen Victoria and Bismarck.

West was also a director of the South Eastern Railway and he caused a new station, named Wanborough but actually at Normandy, to be opened in 1891.  In 1900, Wanborough Manor was passed on to H. H. Asquith until he became Prime Minister.  In 1908, West returned to stay in the manor until his death in 1921.

Family
West married Mary Elizabeth Caroline Barrington, daughter of Hon. George Barrington and Lady Caroline Grey (daughter of Charles Grey, 2nd Earl Grey), on 12 August 1858. Three sons and a daughter survived him.

References

External links

1832 births
1921 deaths
People educated at Eton College
Alumni of Christ Church, Oxford
Members of London County Council
Gentlemen Ushers
Knights Grand Cross of the Order of the Bath
Principal Private Secretaries to the Prime Minister
Progressive Party (London) politicians
Members of the Privy Council of the United Kingdom